Andrew Corden (1978 – 19 May 2002) was a Gaelic footballer. He was the youngest of five children of Frank and Mary Corden. Considered one of Carlow's finest full-backs, he captained the senior intercounty team—his final game coming seven days before his sudden death at the age of 24. He also captained his club team O'Hanrahan's, leading them to a third successive Carlow Senior Football Championship the year before he died.

The death of Corden was the first part of a double disaster for Carlow's footballers. Just as they were preparing to return to full training the sudden death occurred of player Sean Kavanagh's father.

Prior to his death, he led Carlow to the O'Byrne Cup, their first senior trophy. He also led the Carlow team that beat the Dubs in the Kevin Jordan tournament final.

References

 "Big crowd turns out to honour memory of Andrew Corden". 19 July 2002. 
 "Inquest into death of Andrew Corden opens". 2 August 2002. 
 "O'Hanrahans to host first Andrew Corden challenge game this weekend". 3 May 2012.

External links
 Andrew Corden at GAAinfo.com

1978 births
2002 deaths
Carlow inter-county Gaelic footballers